Robert Bruce McClelland  (born 26 January 1958) is an Australian judge and former politician who has served on the Federal Circuit and Family Court of Australia since 2015, including as Deputy Chief Justice of that court since 2018. He was previously Attorney-General of Australia from 2007 to 2011, and a member of the House of Representatives from 1996 to 2013, representing the Labor Party.

Early life and education
McClelland is the son of Doug McClelland, a former Senator for New South Wales between 1962 and 1987, and a minister in the Whitlam government and President of the Senate, serving between 1983 and 1987. His grandfather was Alfred McClelland, a state Labor MP from 1920 to 1932.

McClelland was educated at Blakehurst High School before studying at the University of New South Wales, where he gained bachelor's degrees in arts and law, and the University of Sydney where he gained a master's degree in law.

Career
Prior to entering politics, McClelland was an Associate to Justice Phillip Evatt of the Federal Court of Australia 1981–82 before becoming a solicitor and ultimately partner with law firm Turner Freeman.

Political career
Two years after his election to parliament, McClelland became a member of the Opposition Shadow Ministry. He was Shadow Attorney-General 1998–2003, Shadow Minister for Workplace Relations 2001–03, Shadow Minister for Homeland Security 2003–05, Shadow Minister for Defence 2004–06 and Shadow Minister for Foreign Affairs 2006–07.

After McClelland indicated on 8 October 2007 his party's disapproval of death sentences for all south Asian countries, his leader Kevin Rudd criticized the speech as "insensitive" because it was made on the eve of the anniversary of the Bali bombings. McClelland apologized, but critics called the positions inconsistent and Rudd chose not to appoint McClelland as Foreign Minister when Labor won the 2007 election. Instead, he was appointed Attorney-General. As Attorney-General McClelland introduced the Crimes Legislation Amendment (Torture Prohibition and Death Penalty Abolition) Act 2010.

In the 2007 federal election, McClelland was re-elected to the seat of Barton with a 4.53% swing toward the Labor Party.

In February 2008, McClelland stated that it was unacceptable that the ACT government, which proposed to allow same-sex couples to enter into civil unions, would give the right to hold public ceremonies to celebrate their unions. McClelland was criticised by Greens Senator Bob Brown, who said it was displaying the ugly face of Labor conservatism.
In September 2008 McClelland introduced the Same-Sex Relationships (Equal Treatment in Commonwealth Laws—General Law Reform) Bill 2008 which gave same sex couples equal rights in respect to social security, taxation and superannuation laws.

McClelland has said those protesting against Australian Christian Lobby would not have recognised that the ACL had supported amendments to 84 pieces of Commonwealth legislation that removed discrimination against same-sex couples.

McClelland remarked that on Polygamy in Australia "There is absolutely no way that the government will be recognising polygamist relationships. They are unlawful and they will remain as such. Under Australian law, marriage is defined as the union of a man and a woman to the exclusion of all others. Polygamous marriage necessarily offends this definition."

McClelland was responsible for implementing the recommendations of the Victorian Bushfire Royal Commission including the implementation of a National Emergency Warning System.

As Attorney-General, McClelland undertook an extensive review of the International Arbitration Act. That review formed the basis of amendments to the Act that were introduced in 2010. The Amendments gave arbitral tribunals a wider degree of flexibility in controlling arbitral proceedings and included inserting an object to emphasise the importance of international arbitration in facilitating international trade and commerce. Provisions were also introduced to require Courts applying the Act and the United Nations Commission on International Trade Law (UNCITRAL) Model Law on International Commercial Arbitration Law to have regard to the fact that arbitration is an ‘efficient, impartial, enforceable and timely’ method of dispute resolution.

McClelland also introduced amendments to federal family law, including by giving the federal family law courts jurisdiction over the financial affairs of de facto spouses.

In the 2010 federal election, McClelland was re-elected to the seat of Barton, but suffered an 8.08% swing against the Labor Party.

As part of a cabinet reshuffle in December 2011 he was moved to oversee the portfolio of emergency management and housing. In a further cabinet reshuffle in February 2012 following Kevin Rudd's leadership challenge, McClelland returned to the backbench.

On 29 January 2013, McClelland announced that he would not contest the 2013 federal election.

Judicial career

On 28 May 2015, McClelland was appointed to the Family Court of Australia by Attorney-General George Brandis. He is based in the Court's Sydney registry and his appointment commenced on 16 June 2015. He was appointed Deputy Chief Justice of that court with effect from 10 December 2018.

Honours
In 2022, McClelland was appointed Officer of the Order of Australia in the 2022 Queen's Birthday Honours for "distinguished service to the people and Parliament of Australia, to the law, social justice and law reform".

See also
 First Rudd Ministry
 First Gillard Ministry
 Second Gillard Ministry

References

External links
Personal homepage
Attorney-General homepage

|-

|-

1958 births
20th-century Australian politicians
21st-century Australian politicians
Attorneys-General of Australia
Australian Labor Party members of the Parliament of Australia
20th-century Australian lawyers
Australian people of Scottish descent
Australian solicitors
Government ministers of Australia
Labor Right politicians
Judges of the Family Court of Australia
Living people
Members of the Australian House of Representatives for Barton
Members of the Cabinet of Australia
Officers of the Order of Australia
Politicians from Sydney
Sydney Law School alumni
University of New South Wales Law School alumni
21st-century Australian judges